Bosara subrobusta is a moth in the family Geometridae. It is found in Taiwan and Hong Kong.

References

Moths described in 1988
Eupitheciini
Moths of Asia